Brandegea is a monotypic genus containing the single species Brandegea bigelovii, the desert starvine. This sprawling perennial vine in the squash family is native to the deserts of California, Arizona, and northern Mexico. The distinctive small, dark-green leaves are variable in shape but are usually a deeply lobed long-fingered palmate shape. They are heavily speckled with white oil glands. The vine bears tendrils, tiny five-pointed white flowers only 2 or 3 millimeters wide, and small, dry, prickly fruits 5 or 6 millimeters in length and holding a single seed. The plant grows from a deep taproot.

Classification

References

External links
 Jepson Manual Treatment
 Photo gallery

Cucurbitoideae
Monotypic Cucurbitaceae genera
Flora of Arizona
Flora of California
Flora of Mexico
Flora without expected TNC conservation status
Taxa named by Alfred Cogniaux